The Atantano Shrine is a historic commemorative marker near Piti, Guam. It is topped by a wooden cross and protected by an open concrete shelter. The monument was built in at least three stages, the early stages acting as bases for the mounting of the later ones. Panels on three sides carry inscriptions. The oldest inscription marks the initial construction of the road between Piti and Agat under the governorship of Don Felipe Cerain in 1784–85. The second inscription commemorates the creation of rice fields in the area under by Governor Don Francisco Villabos in 1832–34, and the third marks the reconstruction of the coast road during the governorship of Edward John Dorn in 1908–09. Commemorative markers of this type were a fixture of Spanish colonial administration that were adopted by Guamanians. The shrine has been the site of annual festivities since before World War II.

The site was listed on the National Register of Historic Places in 1995.

See also
National Register of Historic Places listings in Guam

References 

Buildings and structures on the National Register of Historic Places in Guam
Cultural infrastructure completed in 1834